Actibacterium mucosum is a chemoorganotrophic, aerobic and slightly halophilic bacterium from the genus of Actibacterium which has been isolated from water from the beach of Malvarrosa in Spain.

References

Rhodobacteraceae
Bacteria described in 2012